b Persei (also known as HD 26961) is a spectroscopic triple star in the constellation Perseus. Its apparent magnitude is 4.60, and it is about 320 light years away.

In addition to the primary, an A-type giant, there is a smaller and cooler companion in a 1.53 day orbit, probably an F-class star around absolute magnitude 3.0, and a more distant companion (star C or Ac) in an orbit calculated to be 702 days long. The close binary pair forms a rotating ellipsoidal variable with a 1.53 day period. Star C forms an Algol-type variable system with the close binary, showing both primary eclipses (when star C passes in front of the inner pair) and secondary eclipses (when the inner pair passes in front of star C).  Timings of the eclipses show a 705.4-day period.

References

Perseus (constellation)
A-type giants
Persei, b
Persei, b
BD+49 1150
026961
Persei, b
020070
1324
Spectroscopic binaries